Mati Meos (born 5 October 1946 in Jõgeva) is an Estonian politician and engineer. He was a member of VIII Riigikogu and a director and founder of the Estonian Aviation Museum.

References

Living people
1946 births
Estonian engineers
Estonian Coalition Party politicians
Members of the Riigikogu, 1995–1999
Recipients of the Order of the White Star, 4th Class
Tallinn University of Technology alumni
People from Jõgeva